Beauty and Rust is a live album by Lou Reed released in 1992. It was recorded in Leysin, Switzerland.

Track listing
 "Romeo and Juliet"
 "The Sword of Damocles"
 "Walk on the Wild Side"
 "Warrior King"
 "Rock & Roll"
 "The Power and Glory"
 "Magic and Loss"
 "Nobody but You"
 "Images"
 "Strawman"
 "Dirty Blvd"
 "I'm Waiting for the Man"
 "Vicious"

Lou Reed live albums
1992 live albums